Bhimji Depar Shah, is a Kenyan businessman, industrialist and entrepreneur. He is the founder and current chair of BIDCO Group of Companies, a Kenya-based, family-owned manufacturing conglomerate with businesses in 13 African countries.

According to Forbes annual ranking of Africa's richest in Kenya Bhimji Depar Shah is the richest man in Kenya, and 31st richest man in Africa with a net worth of $700 million as of November 2015.

History
He was born in Cairo, Egypt in 1931. He settled in Nyeri, opening up a petrol station in the town. In 1970, he started Bidco Industries Limited, a garments manufacturing business. In 1985, the company switched to soap production. In 1991, Bidco opened up an edible oil manufacturing plant in Thika, and moved its International headquarters into the town, northeast of Nairobi, Kenya's capital. As of November 2014, the industrial conglomerate is a leading manufacturer of soaps, detergents, and baking powder, with annual gross revenue in excess of US$500 million. Bhimji's son Vimal Shah serves as the company's chief executive officer.

See also
 List of wealthiest people in Kenya
 Vimal Shah
 Economy of Kenya

References

External links
   BIDCO Official Website

Living people
Kenyan businesspeople
Kenyan people of Gujarati descent
Kenyan philanthropists
1931 births
Place of birth missing (living people)
Kenyan people of Indian descent